Sinhua District, alternatively spelled Xinhua, is a suburban district in central Tainan, Taiwan.

History
Before the Dutch and Han Chinese invaded, this region was home to a community of Taiwanese aborigines, the Siraya. In 1624, the VOC occupied Tayuan (modern day Anping, Tainan). 

In the past, the Siraya indigenous tribe called this place Tavocan ("land of hill and forest"). Tavakan was a village of about a thousand people; the name was also written Taffacan, Tavocan, Tavacang, and Davocan in Dutch records.

After 1627, the VOC sent missionaries into neighboring districts. In 1635, George Candidius, a Dutch pastor, advised Pieter Nuyts, the leader of the Dutch VOC in Taiwan, that the VOC would have to conquer the aborigines before they could be controlled. In 1636, eighteen tribal groups, including the inhabitants of Tavocan, submitted to Dutch rule.

Since the early part of the 20th century, Sinhua has been an important fruit wholesaling center. Around 1920, dozens of baroque-influenced store buildings were constructed along what is now Jhongjheng Road. Most of these buildings survive in good condition, and the street, known as "Sinhua Old Street," has become a tourist attraction.

In 1945, Sinshih Township was part of Sinhua District.

The Taiwan Communist Party was established on 20 June 2008 in Sinhua.

Geography
Area: 62.06 km2
Population: 43,830 people (January 2016)

Much of the district is rural, with large areas devoted to pineapple cultivation. Sinhua is located on Taiwan Highway No. 20, also known as the Southern Cross-Island Highway, and Freeway Nos. 3 and 8. It borders Yongkang, Shanshang, Sinshih and Guanmiao districts.

The eastern half of the district lies within the Siraya National Scenic Area.

Administrative divisions
The district consists of Wu-An/Wuan, Dong-Rong/Tungrong, Hu-Guo/Huguo, Tai-Ping/Taiping, Sie-Sing/Xiexing, Fong-Kou/Fengkou, Bei-Shih/Beishi, Fong-Rong/Fengrong, Cyan-Sing/Quanxing, Lun-Ding/Lunding, Jhih-Yi/Zhiyi, Shan-Jiao/Shanjiao, Da-Keng/Dakeng, Na-Ba/Naba, Yang-Lin/Xianglin, Jiao-Keng/Jiaokeng Village.

Institutions
 Taiwan Livestock Research Institute

Education

Special School
 The Affiliated Hearing Impaired School of National University of Tainan

Senior High Schools
 National Hsin Hua Senior High School
 National Hsin Hua Industrial Vocational High School

Junior high schools
 Tainan Municipal Hsin Hua Junior High School

Tourist attractions
 Hutoupi Scenic Area
 Xinhua Old Street
 Yang Kui Literature Memorial Museum

Transportation

The Sinhua Bus Station is located in the district. The district is connected to Kaohsiung at Alian District through the Provincial Highway 39.

The Taiwan High Speed Rail track passes through the western part of the district; no station is planned, however.

Notable natives
 Ou Wei, former actor
 Yang Kui, former writer

See also
 Tainan

References

External links

 

Districts of Tainan